Akaze Dam  is a gravity dam located in Ishikawa Prefecture in Japan. The dam is used for flood control. The catchment area of the dam is 40.6 km2. The dam impounds about 54  ha of land when full and can store 6000 thousand cubic meters of water. The construction of the dam was started on 1968 and completed in 1978.

See also
List of dams in Japan

References

Dams in Ishikawa Prefecture